Luxembourg is scheduled to compete at the 2019 European Games, in Minsk, Belarus from 21 to 30 June 2019. Luxembourg has previously competed at the 2015 European Games in Baku, Azerbaijan. 25 athletes in 9 sports will represent Luxembourg in this edition of European Games.

Medalists

Archery

Recurve

Compound

Badminton

Boxing

Men

References

Nations at the 2019 European Games
European Games
2019